Vicki Schmidt (born September 15, 1955) is an American politician who is currently the Kansas Insurance Commissioner. She was a Republican member of the Kansas Senate, representing the 20th district, from 2005 to 2019. She also served as the Senate Assistant Majority Leader from 2009 to 2012. She was elected Kansas Insurance Commissioner in 2018.

Early life
Schmidt attended Wichita South High School in Wichita, Kansas where she met her future husband. After high school, she attended the University of Kansas. She graduated for the school's Pharmacy School.

Committee assignments
In the Kansas Senate, Schmidt served on these legislative committees:
 Public Health and Welfare (chair)
 Joint Committee on Administrative Rules and Regulations (chair)
 State Employee Pay Plan Oversight (chair)
 Education
 Financial Institutions and Insurance
 Transportation
 Health Care Stabilization Fund Oversight Committee

Major donors
Some of the top contributors to Schmidt's 2008 campaign, according to  OpenSecrets:
 Kansas Republican Senatorial Committee, American Federation of Teachers, American Federation of State, County and Municipal Employees (AFSCME), Kansas Association of Realtors, Kansans for Lifesaving Cures, Greater Kansas City Chamber of Commerce, Kansas Medical Society

Financial, insurance and real estate companies were her largest donor group, followed by health care companies.

References

External links
 Schmidt's campaign website
 Ballotpedia

1955 births
21st-century American politicians
21st-century American women politicians
Kansas Insurance Commissioners
Republican Party Kansas state senators
Living people
Politicians from Topeka, Kansas
University of Kansas alumni
Women state legislators in Kansas
Women state constitutional officers of Kansas